Downtown Burlington Historic District is a national historic district located at Burlington, Alamance County, North Carolina, United States. It encompasses 40 contributing buildings in the central business district of Burlington, and was added to the National Register of Historic Places in 1990.

The district includes commercial, industrial, and transportation-related buildings. The majority of the buildings are one to three-story brick commercial buildings dating to the mid-19th and early-20th centuries. Among the buildings located in the district are:
 Alamance Hotel
 Atlantic Bank and Trust Company Building
 Efird Building
 Southern Railway Passenger Station
 United States Post Office
Other notable buildings include the former May Hosiery Mill, C. F. Neese Jewelers Building (1887), Strader Building (1913–1918), McClellan Stores Building ( 1895), Troxler-Cammack Building (1908), and Morris Plan Bank Building ( 1930).

References

Historic districts on the National Register of Historic Places in North Carolina
Art Deco architecture in North Carolina
Neoclassical architecture in North Carolina
Buildings and structures in Burlington, North Carolina
National Register of Historic Places in Alamance County, North Carolina